In the Workhouse : Christmas Day, better known as Christmas Day in the Workhouse, is a dramatic monologue written as a ballad by campaigning journalist George Robert Sims and first published in The Referee for the Christmas of 1877.  It appeared in Sims' regular Mustard and Cress column under the pseudonym Dagonet and was collected in book form in 1881 as one of The Dagonet Ballads, which sold over 100,000 copies within a year.

It is a criticism of the harsh conditions in English and Welsh workhouses under the 1834 Poor Law. As a popular and sentimental melodrama, the work has been parodied many times.

Opening verses

Synopsis
The poem tells of an old Devon trader named John who has been reduced to poverty and so must eat at the workhouse on Christmas Day.  To the shock of the guardians and master of the workhouse, he reviles them for the events of the previous Christmas when his wife, Nance, was starving. They could not afford food so, for the first time, he went to the workhouse but was told that food would not be given out – they would have to come in to eat.  At that time, families might be separated inside such institutions but his wife refused to be parted from her husband of fifty years on Christmas Day. He went out again in search of scraps but she died before he returned and so now he is bitter at the memory.

Author

Sims was a campaigning journalist who, while young, had investigated the poor of London's East End.  The details in this ballad were perhaps not accurate, as the Poor Law regulations did permit old couples to cohabit and allow for short-term relief to be given out, but its melodramatic and sentimental style made it very popular and such work made Sims a great success.  He went on to write detailed exposés of the life of the poor for periodicals such as the Weekly Dispatch, The Pictorial World and The Daily News, which had been founded by Charles Dickens.

Parodies
Among the many parodies of Sims' ballad are "Christmas Day in the Cookhouse" (1930) by British comedian Billy Bennett, recited by a soldier in the 1969 film Oh! What a Lovely War; "'Twas Christmas Day in the Poorhouse" (2000) by Garrison Keillor; and "Christmas Day in Grey Gables", submitted by a listener to the BBC Radio 4's The Archers message board.

See also
 List of Christmas-themed literature

References

Citations

Sources

External links
Christmas Day in the Workhouse – the full poem at the Victorian Web
 (multiple versions)
Recitation by Robert C. Hilliard – recorded by the Victor Talking Machine Company in 1912
T'was Christmas in the Workhouse – parody version recited by Terry Wogan
George R. Sims Collection at John Rylands University Library of Manchester

1877 poems
1877 in England
English poems
Christmas literature
Monologues
Workhouses in the United Kingdom